Philip Charles Anglim (born February 11, 1952) is an American actor. He is best known for his performance as Joseph Merrick in the stage and television versions of The Elephant Man, a role for which he received a Best Actor nomination in the 1979 Tony Awards. Other notable roles include the title role in Macbeth on Broadway and Dane O'Neill, the ill-fated love child who grew up to follow in his unknown father's footsteps on the path to the priesthood in the television mini-series The Thorn Birds. He also had a recurring guest role as the Bajoran priest Vedek Bareil on Star Trek: Deep Space Nine.

Biography
Anglim was born in San Francisco, California. His father, a Catholic of Irish descent, worked as a patent attorney, and his mother, Paule Anglim, was of French-Jewish descent and was a San Francisco art dealer. He originally aspired to become a veterinarian, but after he was asked to appear in a play by one of his teachers, he switched to acting. Anglim graduated with a bachelor's degree in English literature from Yale University in 1973. Subsequently, Anglim spent a year in Connecticut at the Southbury Playhouse.

His feature film debut was in The All-American Boy (1973), and his first television appearance was in the PBS The Adams Chronicles (1976). In 1979, while still an unknown, Anglim optioned the London play The Elephant Man, and debuted off-Broadway at St. Peter's Church. It later moved to The Booth Theater on Broadway in 1979, and earned several awards. He performed as Macbeth on Broadway in 1981 (in which he was replaced by Kelsey Grammer) and again on TV in 1982. In 1982, Anglim appeared in the ABC television version of The Elephant Man, and earned an Emmy nomination for Best Actor for the performance.

Anglim also maintains a cattle farm in Tennessee, and in 1992, founded The Lewis County Children's Fund to help children in the area.

Awards
All of the following were for his performance in The Elephant Man:
 1979 Outstanding Actor in a Play, Drama Desk Award
 1979 nomination for Best Actor, Tony Awards
 1979 Theatre World Award
 1978-1979 OBIE Award Performance
 1982 nomination, Emmy Award
 1982 nomination, Golden Globe

Works

Theater
 What the Butler Saw, 1975, Cincinnati
 The Contrast, 1975, Cincinnati
 Snow White, 1976, New York
 The Elephant Man (1977)
 Macbeth, 1981, New York

Film/television
 The Elephant Man (1982) as John Merrick
 Malone (1987) as Harvey
 Haunted Summer as Lord Byron
 The Man Inside as Rolf Gruel
 The Thorn Birds as Dane O'Neill
 Dallas reunion War of the Ewings
 Millennium episode "Sacrament"
 Macbeth (title role)
 Testament

Star Trek: Deep Space Nine appearances
 "In the Hands of the Prophets"
 "The Circle"
 "The Siege"
 "Shadowplay"
 "The Collaborator"
 "Fascination"
 "Life Support"
 "Resurrection"

References

External links
 
 

1953 births
Living people
American male stage actors
American male television actors
Drama Desk Award winners
Male actors from San Francisco
Obie Award recipients
American people of French-Jewish descent
American people of Irish descent